El Turbio  is a small village belonging to Veintiocho de Noviembre municipality in Santa Cruz Province in southern Argentina.

Climate

Typical to the southern fringes of Santa Cruz, El Turbio observes a borderline subantarctic continental climate (Köppen: Dfc) and subpolar oceanic climate (Köppen: Cfc) due to its consistency in precipitation and year-round chilly temperatures. Summers are relatively mild, and winters are cold in Argentinian standards, both of which are coupled with extremely small diurnal ranges. Due to its moderated climate from the ocean, temperatures hardly exceed 20ºC (even in summer), and at the same time, rarely drops below -5º for winter.

References

Populated places in Santa Cruz Province, Argentina